Toén is a municipality in the Spanish province of Ourense. It has a population of 2649(Spanish 2007 Census) and an area of 58 km².

Population in Toén has suffered big changes all along 20th Century. At the beginning, in 1900, Toén has 3,881 people living in Toén with its maximum level of population in 1950 (4369 people). One of the reasons of this rising population is to be located very near the Capital City in the province Ourense. This slowed emigration, as happened in other municipalities. Nevertheless, this reason was not enough for stopping a decreasing in the population from 1950 to the present.

References  

Municipalities in the Province of Ourense